Neeta Shah (born 2 Jan 1981) is an Indian producer, author, and marketing consultant in Bollywood.

Biography
Shah grew up in a part-Parsi, part-Gujarati family in the Breach Candy locality of South Mumbai. Though she became interested in acting in Bollywood films at age 15, her family convinced her to become a chartered accountant. She attended H.R. College of Commerce and Economics and is a member of the Institute of Chartered Accountants of India.

Shah pursued modelling and was briefly on an MTV television show but ultimately decided not to become an actress. In 2012, she worked as the Vice President of Business Development at iRock Media. Her novel Bollywood Striptease was published by Rupa Publications in February 2012 and iRock Media bought the rights to its film adaption before its released. Her second book, The Stranger In Me was co-written by Aditi Mediratta and released in May 2019. Shah produced and helped finance Noorani Chehra and co-produces the television show Gamer Log. As of 2022, she co-heads Abhinay Deo's production company RDP Pulp Fiction Entertainment.

Filmography

References

1981 births
Living people
English-language writers from India
Indian women novelists
Writers from Mumbai